Obóz Polski Walczącej (OPW, Camp of Fighting Poland, or Fighting Poland Movement) was a minor part of the Polish resistance movement in World War II. It operated from 1942 to 1944, centered in Warsaw. Its members had mostly belonged to the former political party, Obóz Zjednoczenia Narodowego (Camp of National Unity, or 'Ozon'), part of the Sanacja movement. Organizers of this movement included marshal Edward Rydz-Śmigły (who proposed its name) and Julian Piasecki, who became its commandant. It became militarily subordinate to the Armia Krajowa from 1943 and eventually merged with Konwent Organizacji Niepodległościowych (The Council of Independence Organizations) into Zjednoczenie Organizacji Niepodległościowych (The Union of Independence Organizations) in 1944.

References 

 OBÓZ POLSKI WALCZĄCEJ on Encyklopedia Interia
Biography of Edward Rydz-Śmigły

Further reading
J. C. Malinowski, Piłsudczykowski Obóz Polski Walczącej (1940–1945). Zarys struktury i działalności, „Czasy Nowożytne”, t. 9, 2000, s. 152

1942 establishments in Poland
World War II resistance movements
Military units and formations of Poland in World War II
Polish underground organisations during World War II